Equilateral can refer to:

Equilateral polygon, in geometry
Equilateral triangle, in geometry
Equilateral dimension of a metric space, in mathematics 
Equilateral triathlon, in which each leg would take an approximately equal time

See also
Venus Equilateral, a set of 13 science fiction short stories by George O. Smith